The University of Montana (UM) is a public research university in Missoula, Montana. UM is a flagship institution of the Montana University System and its second largest campus. UM reported 10,962 undergraduate and graduate students in the fall of 2018. It is classified among "R1: Doctoral Universities – Very high research activity" as of 2022.

The University of Montana ranks 17th in the nation and fifth among public universities in producing Rhodes Scholars; it has 11 Truman Scholars, 14 Goldwater Scholars, and 40 Udall Scholars to its name. One alumnus, Harold Urey, has won the Nobel Prize.

History

An act of Congress of February 18, 1881, dedicated 72 sections in Montana Territory for the creation of the university.

Montana was admitted to the Union on November 8, 1889, and the state legislature soon began to consider where the state's permanent capital and state university would be located. To be sure that the new state university would be located in Missoula, the city's leaders made an agreement with the standing capital of Helena that Missoula would stay out of the bidding for the new capital and would support Helena over its leading competitor, Anaconda. The cities' bids were supported by the rival "Copper Kings," William A. Clark and Marcus Daly, respectively.

Missoula won the legislative vote for the new university at the Third Montana Legislative Assembly in February 1893, and it was formally opened in 1895. While plans for a university campus were progressing, classes were temporarily held at nearby Willard School. The South Missoula Land Company, owned by A.B. Hammond, Richard Eddy and Marcus Daly, joined with the Higgins family in donating land for the new campus. In June 1898 the cornerstone for A.J. Gibson designed University Hall was laid and Missoula became "the University City."

From 1945 until 1965, the name was changed by the legislature to "Montana State University," while the school in Bozeman was known as "Montana State College."

Presidents

Academics

The University of Montana comprises eleven full colleges and schools: College of Humanities & Sciences; Phyllis J. Washington College of Education and Human Sciences; W.A. Franke College of Forestry and Conservation; College of Health Professions and Biomedical Sciences; College of Visual and Performing Arts; Alexander Blewett III UM School of Law; UM College of Business; UM School of Journalism; UM School of Extended and Lifelong Learning; Missoula College and Bitterroot College.

The Phyllis J. Washington College of Education and Human Sciences is divided into five academic departments and the Institute of Educational Research and Service. In 1914, the University of Montana School of Law became a member of The Association of American Law Schools and in 1923, the school received accreditation from the American Bar Association. The W.A. Franke College of Forestry and Conservation offers five undergraduate majors (Ecosystem Science & Restoration; Forestry; Parks, Tourism & Recreation Management; Resource Conservation; and Wildlife Biology) and five Master's of Science and three PhDs.

Admissions
For the fall 2017 term, 6,182 students applied to the University of Montana. Ninety-three percent were accepted. The entering freshman class had an average high school GPA of 3.55, and the middle 50% range of SAT scores were 540-650 for reading and writing, 520-620 for math, while the ACT Composite range was 21–26.

Campus

The original plan of the campus was designed by one of its first professors, Frederich Scheuch, who called for the central oval to be surrounded by immediate and future university buildings. Although Scheuch's plan called for all building entrances to face the center of the Oval, forming a radiating building pattern, buildings were later constructed with three-story in the Renaissance Revival style, with hipped roofs and Spanish green roof tiles.

The first set of buildings were set up around the oval in 1895. Since that time, various campus plans and architectural styles have been used. The main campus comprises 64 buildings, including nine residence halls and various athletic venues, including Washington–Grizzly Stadium, a 26,500-seat football stadium and the Adams Center (formerly, Dahlberg Arena), a 7,500-seat multi-purpose arena where the university's basketball teams play.

Landmarks include:

The Oval
A   swath of grass running east to west, marking the traditional center of the university.  Today it is divided into quadrants by two intersecting brick-laid paths, though originally the oval was solid grass and forbidden to be crossed by students. A double row of trees was planted around the oval on Arbor Day 1896, but many of the trees have since died and are in the process of being replanted.  The original gravel driveway that once surrounded the Oval has also been replaced by sidewalk. The original master plan of the university called for all buildings to face the center of the oval, but this plan proved difficult and a new plan was created in 1935.

On the western extreme of the Oval is a life-sized grizzly bear statue created by ceramic artist and sculptor Rudy Autio in 1969. Many photographs of the university picture the bear with the Oval, university (Main) Hall, and Mount Sentinel's 'M' in the background.

The "M" trail
The trail offers sweeping views of the city below.

There is debate of when "The 'M'" was first placed on Mount Sentinel. Around 1908, members of the Forestry Club forged a zigzag trail up the mountain and students carried up stones to shape the symbol of the University of Montana. That "M," unlike today's "M," stood upright on the face of Mount Sentinel. A larger wooden version of the "M" was built in 1913 and upkeep of the structure was formally charged to each year's freshman class.

When the large wooden "M" was destroyed by a blizzard in 1915, an even larger version was constructed of whitewashed granite. Once again the freshman class was tasked with annual renovation of the symbol, beginning a new tradition. Each year from then on, University of Montana freshmen made the hike up to the "M" to apply a fresh coat of whitewash and remove any weeds and grass that had grown in and around the structure.

The annual tradition ended in 1968 when a  concrete "M" was built at a cost of $4,328. Behind the decision to replace rock with concrete were maintenance issues; with the coming of the 1960s, UM students exhibited waning enthusiasm for the annual trek up the hill and for annual upkeep of the "M."  Although the annual whitewashing went by the wayside, one tradition that lives on today is the lighting of the "M" during the university's annual Homecoming celebration each fall. Originally lit by a group of students on October 9, 1919, following the fall whitewashing, the event was so popular that students have continued to light the "M" each year during Homecoming week; special beacons light up the giant letter, welcoming former students back to the university.

Memorial Row
On the north side of campus, 29 evergreen trees stand in two columns forming Memorial Row along what used to be the path of Van Buren Avenue. The trees, running from the corner of the Oval to Eddy Avenue, were planted in 1919 following the end of the Great War to honor UM students, alumni, and faculty who died in the war, some to combat and many more to the influenza epidemic. The trees are Pinus ponderosa (Western Yellow Pines or Ponderosa Pine), the state tree of Montana. Originally, a white T-board stood in front of each tree, with the name of the person whom it honors; in 1925, these were replaced with 35 brass nameplates atop concrete markers. At the same time, the university added a memorial tablet on a boulder near the edge of the Oval closest to Memorial Row. It lists 21 of the 31 honorees from 1919. By 1925, the university had increased the number of names on the official list to 35, and sometime later, it grew to 37.

Points of interest include:
 Maureen and Mike Mansfield Library
 Maureen and Mike Mansfield Foundation
 Philip L. Wright Zoological Museum
 University of Montana Herbarium
 Washington–Grizzly Stadium
 spectrUM Discovery Area

Organization and administration

Administration
The University of Montana is the main campus for the university, which includes four other campuses. The public university system is one of two in Montana; the other is Montana State University. Both systems are governed as the Montana University System by the Montana Board of Regents, which consists of seven members appointed by the state governor, and confirmed by the state Senate to serve overlapping terms of seven years, except for one student member who is appointed for one year at a time.. The governor and Superintendent of Public Instruction, both statewide elected officials,  are ex officio members of the Board, as is the Commissioner of Higher Education, who is appointed by the Board of Regents.

The Board of Regents appoints the university president, who is directly responsible and accountable to the Commissioner of Higher Education.

Funding

The total operating budget for the University of Montana for fiscal year 2017 was approximately $423 million. About $149 million comes from the General Funds budget, $108 million from restricted funds, auxiliary funds ($51 million), designated funds ($44 million), and plant funds ($61 million).

Over the past 30 years, state support for higher education has dropped dramatically.  In 1990, the State of Montana provided for 69% of the educational and general funds budget.  It now supports 33% of the general fund or 13% of the university's operating budget.  This decrease in funding has, in part, been made up by the university successfully competing for sponsored research money with a growth from $12 million in 1994 to $88 million in 2017 and salaries as low as 3/5 the national average.

Colleges, schools, and centers
The University of Montana comprises seven colleges and two professional schools:

 College of Humanities and Sciences (1893)
Phyllis J. Washington College of Education and Human Sciences (2009)
W.A. Franke College of Forestry and Conservation (1913)
College of Health Professions and Biomedical Sciences
Skaggs School of Pharmacy (1907)
School of Physical Therapy and Rehabilitation Science
School of Social Work
School of Public and Community Health Sciences
Missoula College University of Montana (1956)
College of Technology
Bitterroot College (Hamilton, MT)
College of the Arts and Media
School of Art
School of Theatre and Dance
School of Media Arts
School of Music (1893)
School of Journalism (1914)
 Davidson Honors College (1991)
College of Business (1918)
School of Law (1911)

The University of Montana is also home to a variety of projects, research centers, and institutes.

Campus media
The Montana Kaimin, founded in 1898, is the student-run college newspaper. It is independent of the university.  It attracted national attention in 2009, when football coach Bobby Hauck refused to take questions from the paper in retaliation for a story about an alleged assault by two Grizzly football players. The Montanan is the university's alumni magazine, published by the University Relations office. CutBank, founded in 1973 by the Creative Writing Program, is a literary magazine. Camas: The Nature of the West, is a literary journal run by graduate students of the Environmental Studies Program.

KBGA (89.9 FM) is the college radio station. KUFM-FM is the flagship and founding station of Montana Public Radio. Founded in 1965, its studios are located in the Broadcast Media Center, of the Performing Arts/Radio Television Center. KUFM-TV (Channel 11) is the local Montana PBS station.

Student life

A variety of student organizations exist on campus. Seven fraternities and four sororities have chapters on campus. The fraternities are Phi Delta Theta (1921), Sigma Nu (established at UM in 1904), Sigma Chi (1905), Sigma Phi Epsilon (1918), Sigma Alpha Epsilon (1927), and Kappa Sigma (1927). The sororities are Kappa Alpha Theta (1909), Kappa Kappa Gamma (1909), Delta Gamma (1911), and Alpha Phi (1918).

The University of Montana's International Program began as the International Student club in 1924. It was founded by Alex Stepanzoff and four other Russians who were the first foreign exchange students at the university and is the oldest student organization at the university. The first study abroad programs were created with programs to France, Germany, and Spain in 1971. In 1981, the Mansfield Center was established and certification in teaching of English as a second language (TESL) began.  As of 2010, the university has partnerships established with over 90 universities in over 40 countries. The largest number of partnership are with universities in Japan (eight), China (seven), and Chile (seven).

Programs on Central and Southwest Asia were created in 1997. UM is currently the only American university offering a Bachelor of Arts in Central and Southwest Asian Studies. In September 2010, the Montana Board of Regents unanimously approved the creation of the Center for the Study of Central and Southwest Asia at The University of Montana.

Transportation
 A parking permit or guest pass is required to park on the UM and Missoula College campuses throughout the year, Monday-Friday 7 am - 5 pm. Areas that are marked as reserved are leased spaces and are not available to use by anyone other than the reserved space owner. Day parking passes for visitors cost $3.50. These passes are sold at University Police, University Center Bookstore, and the Treasury Office in the Lommasson Center and the cashiers window at Missoula College. 
 Students may purchase a full-year parking pass for $232. 
 Since January 2015, all Mountain Lines buses are free to the public. The university can be reached on the Mountain Line bus system on routes 1,8, & 12. Buses do not run on Sundays.
 The university has two Park and Ride lots located to the north, and south of the main campus. They service the Missoula College on East Broadway, Main Campus and Lewis and Clark Villages on Higgins Avenue. Shuttles run every 10–20 minutes 7:25 am–6:15 pm M-F during Fall & Spring semesters.
 UDASH is the late night shuttle service that runs every half hour from campus to Lewis & Clark (student housing), back to campus and then downtown.
 The ASUM Cruiser Co-op program allows students to check out yellow cruiser bike (unisex, with lights, basket, and lock) for up to two days for free with a Griz Card.

Athletics

The athletic teams are nicknamed the Montana Grizzlies, often shortened to Griz or Lady Griz (Lady Griz is only used when referring to the women's basketball team; all other women's teams are known as the Griz). The university has competed in the NCAA's Big Sky Conference since the conference was formed in 1963. From 1924 to 1950, the University of Montana was a member of the Pacific Coast Conference (precursor to today's Pac-12).  The University of Montana has an ongoing rivalry with Montana State University, most notably the cross-state football matchups, known as the "Brawl of the Wild",  but also includes the cross-state club lacrosse matchup, known as the "Copper Cup".

Programs include:
Montana Grizzlies football – Since the 1990s, the Griz have established themselves as one of the most dominant football teams in both the Big Sky Conference and in the NCAA Football Championship Subdivision (known as Division I-AA football before 2006). They won the I-AA national title in 1995 and 2001.
Montana Grizzlies men's basketball – The men's basketball team has established itself in recent years as a power in the Big Sky, and was the conference representative to the NCAA Division I Men's basketball tournament in 2005, 2006, 2010, 2012, 2013, 2018, and 2019. At the 2006 tournament, the 12th-seeded Griz upset fifth-seeded University of Nevada, Reno, 87–79, the school's first win in the tournament in 31 years. The Cinderella run ended against the fourth-seeded Boston College Eagles.
Montana Grizzlies women's basketball – The women's basketball team is the most successful team in the Big Sky Conference. The Lady Griz have won 17 conference titles in 25 years, most recently in 2012, and have competed in the NCAA Women's tournament 17 times. The Lady Griz were coached from 1978 to 2016 by Robin Selvig (Montana, 1974), who had an overall record of 865–286 (.752 winning percentage). Selvig earned his 600th win in just 772 games, the sixth fastest of any NCAA coach (men or women). Selvig finished his career ranked eighth among all women's basketball coaches in victories with 865. Since 2016, the team is coached by former Lady Griz star Shannon Schweyen.

Other intercollegiate sports include men's and women's cross country, women's golf, men's and women's track and field, men's and women's indoor track and field, men's and women's tennis, women's volleyball and women's soccer. In 2015 UM added women's softball.

Intramural sports include men's lacrosse (won 2007 national championship in their division, MCLA-B) and women's lacrosse, the Alpine Ski Team (went to the national championships in winter 2006), rowing, dance and cheer, men's and women's ice hockey, men's soccer, the Woodsman Team, rodeo, the Missoula Footbag Alliance. triathlon, cycling, fencing, Jesters Rugby, and Betterside Women's Rugby.

The mascot of the university is Monte, a Grizzly Bear. In 1897, a live bear cub traveled with UM's football team, then known as the "Bears" (the "Grizzlies" name was adopted in 1923). Numerous live bear cubs who served as university mascots, first named Teddy, then Fessy and finally, in the 1960s, Cocoa. UM's costumed mascot during the 1980s, dubbed Otto, donned a variety of fun-loving outfits to entertain crowds at Grizzly football games. Monte (short for Montana) was born in the mountains of Missoula in the fall 1993. The 2002–03 and 2004–05 National Champion Mascot of the Year (Capital One/ESPN) has evolved into a "motorcycle-riding, break-dancing, back flipping, slam-dunking, movie-making, crowd-surfing, goal post smashing, prank-pulling superstar."

Notable people

Athletes

 Aldo Forte, NFL football player; Chicago Bears offensive tackle.
 Barry Darrow, NFL football player; Cleveland Browns offensive tackle.
 Brian Salonen, NFL football player; Dallas Cowboys tight end.
 Chase Reynolds, NFL football player; St. Louis Rams running back.
 Colt Anderson, NFL football player; Buffalo Bills safety.
 Cory Procter, NFL football player; Miami Dolphins guard/center.
 Dallas Neil, NFL football player; Atlanta Falcons special teams.
 Dan Carpenter, NFL football player; Buffalo Bills placekicker.
 Dave Dickenson, Canadian football player; BC Lions and Calgary Stampeders quarterback, CFL MVP (2000) and Grey Cup MVP (2006).
 Doug Betters, NFL football player; Miami Dolphins defensive end.
 Dustin Lind, director of hitting and assistant hitting coach for the San Francisco Giants
 Guy Bingham, NFL football player; New York Jets center.
 Josh Barnett, former UFC Heavyweight Champion, mixed martial artist.
 Keron DeShields (born 1992), basketball player in the Israeli National League
 Kirk Scrafford, NFL football player; Cincinnati Bengals offensive lineman.
 Kroy Biermann, NFL football player; Buffalo Bills defensive end.
 Larry Krystkowiak, former NBA player and coach, currently head coach University of Utah.
 Lex Hilliard, NFL football player; Miami Dolphins running back.
 Marc Mariani, NFL football player; Tennessee Titans wide receiver, 2011 Pro Bowl selection as return specialist.
 Marty Mornhinweg, played football at Montana before becoming coach in NFL; formerly Baltimore Ravens offensive coordinator.
 Micheal Ray Richardson, NBA player; played for New York Knicks and New Jersey Nets.
 Mickey Sutton, NFL football player; Los Angeles Rams cornerback.
 Mike Lazetich, NFL football player; Los Angeles Rams offensive guard.
 Mike Tilleman, NFL football player; New Orleans Saints defensive tackle.
 Milt Popovich, NFL football player; Chicago Cardinals halfback.
 Raul Allegre, NFL football player; New York Giants placekicker.
 Robin Selvig, basketball player and head coach of Montana Lady Griz.
 Scott Curry, NFL football player; Green Bay Packers offensive lineman.
 Scott Gragg, NFL football player; New York Giants offensive tackle.
 Shann Schillinger, NFL football player; Atlanta Falcons safety.
 Terry Dillon, NFL football player; Minnesota Vikings defensive back.
 Tim Hauck, NFL football player; Green Bay Packers safety.
 Trumaine Johnson, NFL football player; Los Angeles Rams cornerback.
 Wayne Tinkle, former professional basketball player and head coach for university's men's basketball team; currently head coach for Oregon State.

Entertainment and the arts

 Lily Gladstone, actress
 Beth Lo, artist
Miguel del Águila, composer pianist
 Carroll O'Connor, film and television actor, graduate from journalism school, best known for role as Archie Bunker in All in the Family
 Colin Meloy, lead singer and songwriter for The Decemberists
 Eric Braeden, film and television actor, best known for portraying Victor Newman on The Young and the Restless
 George Montgomery, film and television actor, stuntman, painter, and wood craftsman; attended for one year before heading to Hollywood
 J. K. Simmons, actor, known for Oscar-winning role in Whiplash and as J. Jonah Jameson in Spider-Man films and for TV series including Law & Order, The Closer, and Oz
 Jeff Ament, founding member of band Pearl Jam; studied art and played basketball at UM before quitting in middle of sophomore year after university told him it was no longer offering graphic design program*
 Lee Powell, actor
 Reagan Wilson, actress and Playboy model
 Rob Quist, singer and musician
 Sahir Lodhi, film and television actor, radio show host in Pakistan
 Susan Gibson, singer and songwriter, wrote the Dixie Chicks' "Wide Open Spaces" while at UM
 Ted Geoghegan, screenwriter and director, best known for the 2015 horror film We Are Still Here
 Mary Kirkwood, artist

Law, politics, and government

 Charles E. "Chip" Erdmann, Circuit Judge of United States Court of Appeals for the Armed Forces, former Associate Justice of Montana Supreme Court
 Forrest H. Anderson, 17th Governor of Montana
 Garry South, California-based Democratic strategist and commentator, ASUM president (1973–74), national Campaign Manager of the Year (1998), UM Distinguished Alumni Award (2008)
 Gordon Belcourt, former executive director of Montana-Wyoming Tribal Leaders Council
 Jeannette Rankin, first woman elected to US Congress, elected from Montana
 Jerry Daniels, CIA agent in Laos during Vietnam War
 Jim Messina, political staffer, White House Deputy Chief of Staff for President Barack Obama from 2009 to 2011.
 John Milkovich, attorney Andrew member of Louisiana State Senate, reared in Roundup, Montana
 Lee Minto, healthcare and women's rights activist and former executive director of Seattle-King County Planned Parenthood
 Mike Mansfield, U.S. Representative (1943–1953); U.S. Senator (1953–1977); Senate Majority Leader (1961–1977); received both B.A. and M.A. degrees from university and taught Latin American and Far Eastern History before beginning political career.
 Sidney Runyan Thomas, graduate of School of Law, [federal judge on United States Court of Appeals for the Ninth Circuit
 Ted Schwinden, 23rd Lieutenant Governor of Montana and 19th Governor of Montana

Journalism
 Hank Green, editor-in-chief of EcoGeek.org; half of popular YouTube channel VlogBrothers  
Vernon Arnold Haugland, author, AP WWII and NASA reporter, first civilian recipient of the Silver Star  
Jennifer Servo, 22-year-old broadcast journalist
 Meg Oliver, anchor of the CBS overnight news program Up to the Minute
 Molly Wood, executive editor for CNET, host of podcast Buzz Out Loud

Science and academia
 Emily Graslie, host of YouTube channel The Brain Scoop and first ever Chief Curiosity Correspondent at Chicago's Field Museum of Natural History.
Helen M. Duncan, geologist and paleontologist  
Harold Urey, physical chemist, won Nobel Prize in Chemistry in 1934 for work on isotopes; Harold C. Urey Lecture Hall at university named in his honor  
James B. Yule, pioneer of aerial photography and photogrammetry for the United States Forest Service
Jessie M. Bierman, public health physician and academic
John P. Grotzinger, geology professor
Lisa Parks, media scholar
Mark Angelo, founder of World Rivers Day
 Ragan Callaway, Regent's Professor of Ecology, expert in ecological facilitation and invasive species research.
 R. Thomas Flynn, college administrator who has worked at Rutgers University, Ocean Community College and Monroe Community College
 Reynold C. Fuson, chemist
Raymond R. Rogers, geology professor
Stewart M. Brandborg, conservationist
 Steve Running, Regent's Professor of Ecology, expert in global ecosystem monitoring, member of Intergovernmental Panel on Climate Change
Carla Dove, ornithologist and leading expert of bird-aircraft strikes

Writers

 A.B. Guthrie Jr., Pulitzer Prize–winning author, screenwriter, historian
 Allie Brosh, blogger, webcomic artist, author; author/illustrator of Hyperbole and a Half
 Andrew Sean Greer, winner of the 2018 Pulitzer Prize in Fiction for his novel Less
 Anthony Cronin, Irish writer and poet, visiting lecturer 1966 - 1968
 Dan Flores, historian of American West; holds A.B. Hammond Chair at UM
 Deirdre McNamer, writer
 Judy Blunt, writer of Breaking Clean, currently associate professor at UM
 Ed Skoog, writer and poet
 Eduardo Chirinos, Peruvian poet, associate professor at UM
 J. Robert Lennon, writer
 James Welch, award-winning author
 Joanna Klink, poet
 Richard Hugo, poet and professor whose work reflected economic depression in Northwest
 Shannon Hale, young adult fantasy and adult fiction author
 William Finnegan, winner of the 2016 Pulitzer Prize in Biography/Autobiography for his 2015 memoir Barbarian Days, A Surfing Life

See also
 List of forestry universities and colleges
 University of Montana Grizzly Marching Band

Notes

References

External links

 
 Montana athletics website
 
 

 
Education in Missoula, Montana
Educational institutions established in 1893
Universities and colleges accredited by the Northwest Commission on Colleges and Universities
Tourist attractions in Missoula, Montana
Flagship universities in the United States
1893 establishments in Montana
University of Montana